= Crisis response team =

Crisis response team may refer to:

- A SWAT team
- An emergency response team focusing on post trauma counseling
